The French brig Néarque was an Abeille-class brig launched at Lorient in  1804. She made a voyage to the Caribbean in 1805. After the frigate HMS Niobe captured her in March 1806, the Royal Navy took her into Plymouth, but laid her up in ordinary. She then disappears from the records until her sale in 1814.

French career
From June 1803 lieutenant de vaisseau Jean-Philippe-Paul Jourdain remained at Lorient to supervise the construction of Néarque. He would remain her commander until the British captured her.

On 27 April 1805, Jourdain and Néarque captured the British 16-gun brig Heros after an engagement that lasted half an hour and in which Jourdain sustained two wounds.

Between early September 1805 and end-December, Néarque carried dispatches from Lorient to Martinique and back, then troops from Belle Île to Lorient, patrolled the southern coast of Brittany, and escorted a convoy from Lorient to Bénodet, returning to Lorient. Then in February 1806, she sailed from Groix to Concarneau.

Capture and fate
On 28 March a French squadron composed of the two 40-gun frigates Revanche, Commodore Amand Leduc, and Guerrière, Captain Paul-Mathieu Hubert, 36-gun frigate Sirène, Captain Alexandre Lambert, and Néarque, sailed from Lorient, on a cruise off the coast of Iceland, Greenland, and Spitzbergen, for the purpose of destroying British and Russian whaling ships. It quickly became evident that Néarque was a far worse sailer than the frigates and that she could not follow; Leduc detached her so that she would carry out her orders independently.

At about 10a.m. Niobe, Captain John Wentworth Loring, cruising between the Glénans and the isle of Groix, discovered the French squadron. He followed and at 10p.m. was able to capture the sternmost, which was Nearque. He reported that she had 97 men on board and stores and provisions for a five-month cruise. James reports that although Nearque made signals, the three French frigates continued on their mission, leaving her to her fate. Furthermore, she surrendered after a volley of small arms fire from Niobe that "fortunately injured no one".

Lloyd's List reported Nearques arrival at Plymouth, and gave her complement as 103 men. It further reported that  and Niobe had continued in pursuit of the rest of the French squadron.

Nearque arrived in Plymouth on 3 April 1806. The Royal Navy never commissioned her; instead, the Admiralty placed her in ordinary. The commissioners of the Navy put her up for sale at Plymouth in July 1814. She sold there on 21 July for £400.

Notes

Citations

References
Fonds Marine. Campagnes (opérations; divisions et stations navales; missions diverses). Inventaire de la sous-série Marine BB4. Tome premier: BB210 à 482 (1805-1826) 

  
 
 
 

1804 ships
Brigs of the French Navy
Brigs of the Royal Navy
Captured ships
Abeille-class brigs